Ricard Alarcón Tevar (born 18 August 1991) is a water polo player from Spain. He was part of the Spanish team at the 2016 Summer Olympics, where the team finished in seventh place.

References

Spanish male water polo players
Living people
1991 births
Olympic water polo players of Spain
Water polo players at the 2016 Summer Olympics
Mediterranean Games silver medalists for Spain
Mediterranean Games medalists in water polo
Competitors at the 2013 Mediterranean Games
21st-century Spanish people